Pacifiphantes is a genus of dwarf spiders that was first described by K. Y. Eskov & Y. M. Marusik in 1994.

Species
 it contains two species:
Pacifiphantes magnificus (Chamberlin & Ivie, 1943) – USA, Canada
Pacifiphantes zakharovi Eskov & Marusik, 1994 (type) – Russia, China, Korea

See also
 List of Linyphiidae species (I–P)

References

Araneomorphae genera
Linyphiidae
Spiders of Asia
Spiders of North America
Spiders of Russia